Enkianthus perulatus (dodan-tsutsuji) is a species of flowering plant in the family Ericaceae, native to Japan. Pendent umbels of pure white, bell-shaped flowers in spring are followed in autumn by brilliant red and yellow leaf colours. Its leaves are ovate and medium to bright green in colour. It grows in sunny woodland areas.

In cultivation this plant has gained the Royal Horticultural Society's Award of Garden Merit.

It is the flower of Chizu, Tottori, where a doudan tsutsuji festival is held in May.

References

Ericaceae
Flora of Japan